Antonio Riccoboni (1541 – 1599) was an Italian scholar, active during the Renaissance as a classical scholar or humanist and historian.

Biography 
Antonio Riccoboni was born in Rovigo. First making his life as a tutor, he moved in 1570 to Venice and Padua to study at the University under Paolo Manuzio, Marc-Antoine Muret, and Carlo Sigonio. By 1571, he had been granted a doctorate in civil law,  and soon after degrees in canonl law. The next year he obtained a post as professor rhetoric at the university, succeeding Giovanni Fasolo.

Among his works were comments regarding the Poetics and Nicomachean Ethics of Aristotle. He also published De Gymnasio Patavino (1598) about the University of Padua. He was among those to claim as fraudulent the Consolatio of Cicero published by Sigonio. Riccoboni died in Padua.

Main works

References

Bibliography 

 

1541 births
1599 deaths
Italian classical scholars
Italian Renaissance humanists
16th-century Italian writers